Chandler is a ghost town in Fremont County, located south of the Lincoln Park area near Cañon City, Colorado. Chandler was a company coal mining town owned and operated by the Victor-American Fuel Company. It is located south of State Highway 115 along a county road named Chandler Road, west of Williamsburg, Colorado and north of Rockvale, Colorado. It was originally homesteaded in the 1880s, and the last ore was hauled out in 1942. The town is now completely depopulated. Chandler was home to a significant Asian-American mining population.

References

Ghost towns in Colorado
Former populated places in Fremont County, Colorado